Bernard & Graefe is a German book publisher, which since 1991 has been part of the Mönch publishing group. It was founded in 1918 in Königsberg, and publishes a range of non-fiction titles including "the most universally respected books on the German Federal Armed Forces".  The parent Monch group specialises in defence and national security topics.

References

Book publishing companies of Germany
Publishing companies established in 1918